Kirill Valeryevich Kruze (born 13 October 1983) is a former Russian professional football player.

Club career
He made his Russian Football National League debut for FC Anzhi Makhachkala on 17 July 2006 in a game against FC Spartak Nizhny Novgorod. That was his only season in the FNL.

External links
 
 Career summary by sportbox.ru
 

1983 births
People from Artyom, Russia
Living people
Russian footballers
Association football forwards
FC Moscow players
FC Arsenal Tula players
FC Anzhi Makhachkala players
FC Metallurg Lipetsk players
Sportspeople from Primorsky Krai